Niki Smith is an American author and cartoon artist.

Personal life 
Although Smith was raised in Kansas, they currently live in Germany.

Selected works

The Deep and Dark Blue (2020) 

The Deep and Dark Blue is a middle-grade graphic novel published January 7, 2020 by Little, Brown Books for Young Readers.

Crossplay (2018) 
Crossplay is an erotic graphic novel published May 11, 2018 by Iron Circus Comics. In 2019, the book was shortlisted for a Lambda Literary Award for LGBTQ Erotica.

Publications

Adult novels 

 Crossplay (2018)

Children's novels 

 The Deep & Dark Blue (2020)
 The Golden Hour (2021)

Short story collections 

 Your Hair (2012)

Anthologies 

 Yuri Monogatari: Volume 5 (2007)
 Best Erotic Comics 2009 (2009)
 Smut Peddler (2014)
 Beyond: the Queer Sci-Fi & Fantasy Comic Anthology (2015)
 Love in All Forms: The Big Book of Growing Up Queer (2015)
 Food Porn: A Recipe for Pure Delight (2016)
 Enough Space for Everyone Else (2017)
 Mine!: A Comics Collection to Benefit Planned Parenthood (2017)
 Oh Joy Sex Toy, Vol. 4 (2017)
 Score!: A Hot Line-up of Erotic Sports Comics (2018)
 Come Together: A European Anthology of Erotic Comics (2019)

References

External links
 Official website

Living people
Writers from Kansas
German LGBT writers
American LGBT writers
American LGBT artists
German LGBT artists
LGBT comics creators
Non-binary artists
Year of birth missing (living people)